Nigel John Kalton (June 20, 1946 – August 31, 2010) was a British-American mathematician, known for his contributions to functional analysis.

Career

Kalton was born in Bromley and educated at Dulwich College, where he excelled at both mathematics and chess. After studying mathematics at Trinity College, Cambridge, he received his PhD, which was awarded the Rayleigh Prize for research excellence, from Cambridge University in 1970. He then held positions at Lehigh University in Pennsylvania, Warwick, Swansea, University of Illinois, and Michigan State University, before becoming full professor at the University of Missouri, Columbia, in 1979.

He received the Stefan Banach Medal from the Polish Academy of Sciences in 2005. A conference in honour of his 60th birthday was held in Miami University of Ohio in 2006. He died in Columbia, Missouri, aged 64.

Publications

Notes

External links
Memorial Webpage

1946 births
2010 deaths
20th-century American mathematicians
21st-century American mathematicians
20th-century British mathematicians
21st-century British mathematicians
University of Missouri faculty
Functional analysts